Nigel Peyton (born 5 February 1951) is a retired British Anglican bishop. From 2011 until 2017, he served as the Bishop of Brechin in the Scottish Episcopal Church.

Early life and education
Born in London in 1951, he was educated at the University of Edinburgh, graduating with a Master of Arts degree in 1973 and a Bachelor of Divinity degree in 1976.

Ordained ministry
He was ordained in the Anglican ministry as a deacon in 1976 and a priest in 1977. Between 1999 and 2011, he served as the Archdeacon of Newark in the Diocese of Southwell and Nottingham.

Episcopal ministry
He was elected the Bishop of Brechin, ordinary (diocesan bishop) of the Scottish Episcopal Church Diocese of Brechin on 18 May 2011. He was consecrated and installed in a special service at St Paul's Cathedral, Dundee on 8 October 2011. In March 2017 it was announced that Dr Peyton would retire as 50th Bishop of Brechin at the end of July, and the process to elect his successor began in September 2017.

In retirement, Peyton has been licensed as an honorary assistant bishop of the Diocese of Lincoln, England, since 2017.

References

1951 births
Living people
Alumni of the University of Edinburgh
Archdeacons of Newark
Bishops of Brechin (Episcopalian)
Anglican clergy from London
21st-century Scottish Episcopalian bishops